The 108th Sustainment Brigade is a sustainment brigade of the United States Army National Guard in Illinois.

The 33rd Area Support Group transformed into the 108th Sustainment Brigade. With more than 1,700 Soldiers, the Chicago-based brigade is made of Medical, Personnel support, and Transportation support units.

The distinctive unit insignia was originally approved for the 108th Quartermaster Regiment, Illinois National Guard on 19 May 1939. It was rescinded on 10 January 1943. It was reinstated and redesignated for the 108th Supply and Transport Battalion, Illinois Army National Guard on 10 December 1964. The insignia was redesignated for the 108th Support Battalion, Illinois Army National Guard on 26 November 1968. It was redesignated for the 108th Maintenance Battalion, Illinois Army National Guard on 23 December 1997. The insignia was redesignated for the 108th Sustainment Brigade on 13 October 2006.

The Brigade’s current mission is to provide sustainment operations for the 34th Red Bull Infantry Division, Minnesota Army National Guard. This partnership between units in Illinois and Minnesota is part of the Army National Guard effort to align division headquarters with down-trace formations for training.

History
Defining itself as "Chicago's Brigade" the 108th Sustainment Brigade has developed into a highly diverse and capable force to execute both state directed and federal missions. The brigade headquarters deployed to Iraq after mobilizing in mid-July 2019 and provided logistics training to the Iraqi Army at Camp Taji. They returned to the United States in May 2020.

Units
Headquarters and Headquarters Company, 108th Sustainment Brigade
108th Brigade Special Troops Battalion
108th Signal Company
 108th Multifunctional Medical Battalion
708th Medical Company
709th Area Support Medical Company
710th Area Support Medical Company
725th Transportation Company
 1144th Transportation (MT) Battalion
1244th Transportation Company
1644th Transportation Company
1744th Transportation Company
1844th Transportation Company
 232nd Combat Service Support Battalion
1344th Transportation Company
1544th Transportation Company
3625th Support Maintenance Company
3637th Support Maintenance Company
733rd Quartermaster Platoon (FFP)
128th Quartermaster Platoon (FFP) 
Theater Gateway Personnel Accountability Team

Currently the 108th Sustainment Brigade is headquartered in Chicago, Illinois.

References

Illinois National Guard Homepage 
The Institute of Heraldry: 108th Sustainment Brigade

108
Illinois National Guard units
Military units and formations established in 2007